Lord House may refer to one of the following:

Lord House in Lords Valley, Pennsylvania
Lord Farm in Wells, Maine
Lord Mansion in Kennebunk, Maine
Capt. Nathaniel Lord Mansion in Kennebunkport, Maine
Lord-Dane House in Alfred, Maine
Lord's Castle in Waltham, Massachusetts

See also

Lords Hoese, English noble house
 The House of the Lord (book) a 1912 book by James E. Talmage about LDS temples
 house of the lord
 
 House of Lords (disambiguation)
 House (disambiguation)
 Lord (disambiguation)